PT Telekomunikasi Selular (trading as Telkomsel) is an Indonesian wireless network provider founded in 1995 and is owned by Telkom Indonesia (65%) and Singtel (35%). It is headquartered in South Jakarta.

Telkomsel is the largest cellular telecommunication carrier in the country with 169.5 million customer base as of 2020. The company operates their GSM network on the 900–1800 MHz frequency range, as well as 3G, 4G, and 5G services on other frequencies. Telkomsel operates a variety of mobile services, chief among them are Telkomsel PraBayar (a consolidation of simPATI, kartuAs, and LOOP, all of them Telkomsel's prepaid services) and Telkomsel Halo (formerly kartuHalo). These brands differ on their payment model (prepaid vs. postpaid) as well as pricing. As of the first quarter of 2020, Telkomsel had a 66.4% share of the Indonesian mobile phone market.

History

Telkomsel was incorporated on 26 May 1995 in Jakarta, Indonesia by PT Telekomunikasi Indonesia Tbk (Telkom) and PT Indosat Tbk (Indosat). In 1996, KPN Netherlands (KPN) and PT Setdco Megacell Asia (Setdco) acquired stakes in Telkomsel of 17.3% and 5%, respectively. In 2001, Telkom acquired Indosat shares to increase its ownership to 77.7%, while KPN and Setdco’s shares were acquired by Singtel Mobile. The following year, Singtel Mobile increased its ownership by 12.7%, bringing its total ownership in Telkomsel to 35%, while it is majority owned by Telkom Indonesia with 65% of the shares.

In November 1997, Telkomsel became the first wireless carrier in Asia to introduce rechargeable GSM pre-paid services (branded as simPATI until the 2021 rebrand). In September 2006, Telkomsel became the first carrier in the country to launch a 3G service.

On 20 March 2009, Telkomsel and Apple South Asia Pte. Ltd. launched the iPhone 3G in Indonesia with customised price plans for all of Telkomsel's customers. Three years later, Telkomsel had acquired more than 100 million active customers.

In 2014, 11 million former Telkom Flexi (the parent company's fixed wireless access service) subscribers were migrated to either kartuAs or kartuHALO service (depending on their plan) when Telkom, along with various other cellular providers across the country, ended their CDMA services.

In April 2017, the company website was hacked, and a message protesting about high charges and unnecessary extra services was posted containing numerous offensive words. There was widespread support for the hacker on social media.

In June 2021, Telkomsel became the first carrier in the country to launch a 5G service, with limited rollout in certain regions in Jakarta and South Tangerang, along with Batam. In 18 June 2021, Telkomsel launched its new logo, replacing the old logo that has been used 26 years since its foundation.

Network coverage
As of 2018, Telkomsel had 160,705 Base Transceiver Stations (BTS) with 68.7% being 3G/4G capable. The network uses GSM Dual Band (900 & 1800), GPRS, EDGE, 3G, 4G, and 5G technologies.

References

External links
 

Indonesian brands
Indonesian companies established in 1995
Joint ventures
Mobile phone companies of Indonesia
Telecommunications companies of Indonesia
Telecommunications companies established in 1995
Telkom Indonesia